David L. Campbell (born March 15, 1944) was a Michigan politician.

Early life
Campbell was born on March 15, 1944.

Education
Campbell earned a B.A in political science from Michigan State University and a J.D from the University of Detroit.

Career
Campbell was an attorney, and a member of multiple bar associations, including the American Bar Association, Michigan Bar Association, and Oakland County Bar Association. On November 2, 1976, Campbell was elected to the Michigan House of Representatives where he represented the 68th district from January 12, 1977 to December 31, 1980. In 1982, Campbell was an unsuccessful candidate in the Republican primary for the Michigan Senate seat representing the 16th district.

Personal life
Campbell married in 1972 and had three children. Campbell lived in Clawson, Michigan during his time in the legislature. Campbell is Protestant.

References

Living people
1944 births
American Protestants
Michigan State University alumni
Michigan lawyers
People from Clawson, Michigan
Republican Party members of the Michigan House of Representatives
20th-century American politicians
20th-century American lawyers